Joshua C. Terenzini (born 1987) is an American politician serving as a member of the Vermont Senate from the Rutland-4 district. Elected in November 2020, he assumed office on January 6, 2021.

Background 
Terenzini was born and raised in Rutland, Vermont. Terenzini served on the Rutland Town Selectboard for 10 years and was also a volunteer member of the Rutland Fire Department. Terenzini is a district sales manager at a Mattress Firm branch location. Terenzini was elected to the Vermont Senate in November 2020 and assumed office on January 6, 2021.

References 

1987 births
People from Rutland (town), Vermont
Republican Party Vermont state senators
Living people